Samoa competed at the 2019 Pacific Games in Apia, Samoa from 7 to 20 July 2019. As the host nation, Samoa participated in all 26 sports present at the 2019 games.

Archery

Athletics

Badminton

Samoa qualified ten players in Badminton for the 2019 games.

Men
 Tupu Fua
 Charles Iamanu Faalogoifo
 Joetel Ng Lam
 Aukuso Samuelu Sue
 Kennedy Simanu
 Hilton Soo

Women
 Folole Ioane
 Angel Reti
 Cherish Reti
 Peta Teo

Basketball

5x5

Men's basketball
* TBC

Women's basketball

 TBC

3x3 basketball

Samoa selected eight players (four male and four female) to compete in 3x3 at the 2019 games:

Men
 Ezra Tufuga
 Dru-Leo Ape
 Ryan Paia
 Theodore McFarland

Women
 Cherish Manumaleuga
 Aufui Sa'u
 Sommer Motufoua
 Zhanay Hettig

Boxing

Cricket

Football

Men's football

Squad
TBC

Women's football

Squad
TBC

Golf

Samoa named teams of four men and four women to compete in the 2019 golf tournament:

Men
 Robert Fa'aaliga 
 Samu Ropati
 Van Wright
 Niko Vui

Manager: Mike Kapisi

Women
 Faith Vui
 Olive Auva'a
 Aileen Meredith
 Leleaga Meredith

Manager: Bronwyn Sesega

Judo

Lawn bowls

Netball

Samoa named eleven women in their netball team for the 2019 games.

Outrigger canoeing

Powerlifting

Rugby league nines

Men's rugby league
 TBC

Women's rugby league
 TBC

Rugby sevens

Men's sevens

Samoa registered a squad of fourteen players for the men's sevens tournament, with two to be omitted from the final team at the 2019 games. 

Manu Samoa sevens squad
 David Afamasaga
 Elisapeta Alofipo
 Tomasi Alosio Logotuli
 Siaosi Asofolau
 Laaloi Leilua
 Tila Mealoi
 Alamanda Motuga
 Joe Perez
 Paul Lusi Perez
 Johnny Samuelu
 Tofatuimoana Solia
 Paulo Toilolo Fanuasa
 John Vaili
 Sione Young Yen

Coach: Gordon Tietjens

Women's sevens

Samoa registered a squad of fifteen players for the women's sevens tournament, with three to be omitted for the final team at the 2019 games. 

Manusina sevens squad
 Caitlin  Pritchard
 Epi  Tafili
 Soteria Pulumu
 Elisapeta Leti
 Mauisuimatamaalii Tauasa Pauaraisa
 Lomi Peniamina
 Fa'alua Lefulefu
 Ta'imua Ta'iao
 Victoria Lauina
 Perise Tumutumu
 Seifono Misili
 Easter Savelio
 Alafou Fatu
 Apaau Ma'ilau
 Maria Jacinta Ausai

Coach: La’auli Rudy Leavasa

Sailing

Shooting

Squash

Swimming

Samoan national swim coach Suzie Schuster named fifteen swimmers, ten men and five women, for the 2019 games.

Men
 Pitapola Ioane
 Gideon Mulitalo
 Durant Webster
 Seth Bates
 Ronny Iosefatu
 Brandon Schuster
 Vernon Wetzell
 Thomas Kokoro Frost
 Thomas Auega Morriss
 Sitivi Sooaemalelagi

Women
 Lushavel Stickland
 Jelani Wetzell
 Lauren Sale
 Kaiya Brown
 Andrea Schuster

Table tennis

Taekwondo

Tennis

Touch rugby

Triathlon

Volleyball

Beach volleyball

Volleyball (Indoor)

Weightlifting

Samoa named twelve men and nine women to compete in weightlifting at the 2019 games.

Men
 Malachi Faamausilifala
 Jack Opeloge
 Vaipava Ioane
 Siaosi Leuo
 Lauititi Lui
 Sanele Mao
 Maeu Nanai Livi
 Don Opeloge
 Petunu Opeloge Tovia
 John Tafi
 Tavita  Toe Leilua
 Petelo Tuiloma Lautusi

Women
 Tauvale Elia Ulaula
 Lesila Fiapule
 Sekolasitika Isaia
 Loto Pereira
 Tuualii Ropati
 Saofaialo Jim
 Iuniarra Sipaia
 Leotina Sive Petelo
 Feagaiga Stowers

References

Nations at the 2019 Pacific Games
2019